Burmese tofu (or) is a food of Shan origin, made from water and flour ground from yellow split peas and the Burmese version of chickpea flour, also known as besan flour, in a fashion similar to polenta. The flour is mixed with water, turmeric, and a little salt and heated, stirring constantly, until it reaches a creamy consistency. It is then transferred into a tray and allowed to set. It can also be made using dried chickpea instead of processed flour. In this process, dried chickpeas are soaked overnight. Once the peas have been re-hydrated, they are ground into a puree with some of the liquid used to soak the peas, then allowed to set for a couple of hours. Much of the top layer of clear liquid is then skimmed off and the remaining puree is brought to a boil with turmeric and salt and cooked and set in the same manner as the version using chickpea flour. It is matte yellow in colour, jelly-like but firm in consistency, and does not crumble when cut or sliced. It may be eaten fresh as a Burmese tofu salad or deep-fried into a Burmese fritter. It may also be sliced and dried to make crackers for deep frying. Despite the name, Burmese tofu is unrelated to Chinese tofu, which is made from soy milk with added coagulants.

Varieties and etymology

Pè bya refers to Chinese tofu and is translated into 'beancurd' in English in Myanmar. Stinky tofu or the fermented form of tofu, however, is called si to hpu, probably a version of the Chinese word chòu dòufu.
 (တိုဖူးခြောက်း ) is yellow tofu sliced into a long thin rectangular form and dried in the sun. They are similar to fish or prawn crackers and sold in bundles.
To hpu (တိုဖူး or တို့ဖူး) made from chickpea (kala bè) flour or pè hmont is the common version in mainland Burma. It has the same yellow colour and taste but slightly firmer than Shan tofu.
Hsan ta hpo (ဆန်တဖိုး) is still mainly confined to Shan regions, made from rice flour called hsan hmont or mont hmont, and is white in colour. It has the same consistency but slightly different in taste. It is as popular as the yellow form as a salad.

There is no  (as in "French") in the Burmese language; hence,  (as in the word "pot") is used in to hpu, the Burmese version of "tofu".

Preparation

Fried

 (တိုဖူးကြော်) is yellow tofu cut into rectangular shapes, scored in the middle, and deep fried. Tofu fritters may be eaten with a spicy sour dip, or cut and made into a salad. They are crispy outside and soft inside. They are similar to the Sicilian snack panelle.
  (နှစ်ပြန်ကြော်) is so called because the fritters are "twice fried" after the tofu is cut into triangular shapes. It is the traditional form in the Shan States.
  (တိုဖူးခြောက်ကြော်) or deep fried tofu crackers, like , are usually served with htamin gyin, balls kneaded together with tomato and fish or potato), another popular Shan dish.
Green tea is the preferred traditional drink to go with all these in Burma.

Salad

To hpu thouk (တိုဖူးသုပ်) or tofu salad with either to hpu or hsan ta hpo is very popular as a snack or a meal in itself whereas  fried tofu on its own is considered a snack. Both may form part of a meal where all the dishes are customarily shared at the same time. Fresh tofu, cut into small rectangular slices, constitutes the main ingredient of the salad, dressed and garnished with peanut oil, dark soy sauce, rice vinegar, toasted crushed dried chilli, crushed garlic, crushed roasted peanuts, crisp-fried onions, and coriander. This dish is similar to the Chinese dish liangfen.
 (တိုဖူးကြော်သုပ်) refers to tofu fritters cut up and served as a salad as above.
It may be combined in the same dish with tofu fritters or rice noodles.

Curried
 To hpu gyet (တိုဟူးချက်) - Sliced yellow tofu may also be curried with fresh tomatoes, onions and garlic, cooked in peanut oil and fish sauce, and garnished with coriander and green chilli. It makes a good pescatarian dish to go with rice, but also popular among the poor if meat or poultry is unaffordable.

Gallery

See also

Cuisine of Myanmar
Dotorimuk
Farinata
Hwangpomuk
Jidou liangfen
Memilmuk
Nokdumuk
Panelle
Tofu

Notes

External links
Burmese tofu recipe
Large scale manufacture of Shan tofu Inle Lake, Myanmar - video

Burmese cuisine
Tofu
Legume dishes
Chickpea dishes